The Nkhula A Hydroelectric Power Station, also Nhula A Hydroelectric Power Station, is a hydroelectric power plant on the Shire River in  Malawi. The power was developed in stages, with the first phase involving the installation of three 8 megawatts-generating turbines. Phase I of the power station was officially opened in 1966.

In April 2017, the Electricity Generation Company Malawi Limited (Egenco), began the first major overhaul of the power station since its inception, over 50 years earlier. The overhaul involves the replacement of the old power generators with new modern generators with new capacity of 36 megawatts. The ongoing renovations are expected to conclude in July 2018.

Location
The geographical coordinates of this power station are: 15°30'44.0"S,  34°50'05.0"E (Latitude:-15.512222; Longitude:34.834722).

Overview
Nkhula A was the first major hydroelectric power station built in Malawi. The power station was built in two phases, with the first phase completed in 1966. The second phase involved major overhaul of the power plant and expansion of capacity from 24 megawatts to 36 megawatts. This upgrade is expected to conclude in July 2018. The new turbines are expected to serve for the next 25 years.

See also

 List of power stations in Malawi
 List of power stations in Africa

References

External links
Energy supply in Malawi: Options and issues As of May 2015.

Energy infrastructure completed in 1966
Hydroelectric power stations in Malawi
1966 establishments in Malawi
2018 establishments in Malawi
Energy infrastructure completed in 2018